Dorcadion coiffaiti is a species of beetle in the family Cerambycidae. It was described by Breuning in 1962.

See also 
Dorcadion

References

coiffaiti
Beetles described in 1962